
Gmina Załuski is a rural gmina (administrative district) in Płońsk County, Masovian Voivodeship, in east-central Poland.

Villages
Gmina Załuski contains the villages and settlements of Falbogi Wielkie, Gostolin, Kamienica, Kamienica-Wygoda, Karolinowo, Koryciska, Kroczewo, Michałówek, Naborowiec, Naborowo, Niepiekła, Nowe Olszyny, Nowe Wrońska, Przyborowice Dolne, Przyborowice Górne, Sadówiec, Słotwin, Smólska, Sobole, Stare Olszyny, Stare Wrońska, Stróżewo, Szczytniki, Szczytno, Wilamy, Wojny, Załuski, Zdunowo and Złotopolice.

Neighbouring gminas
Gmina Załuski is bordered by the gminas of Czerwińsk nad Wisłą, Joniec, Naruszewo, Płońsk and Zakroczym.

References
Notes

Source
Polish official population figures 2006

Zaluski
Płońsk County